Johannesburg Festival Overture is a composition for orchestra by the English composer William Walton, composed for the 70th anniversary of Johannesburg in 1956.

In January 1956, Walton received a commission from Ernest Fleischmann, musical director of the Johannesburg Festival Committee, to celebrate the seventieth anniversary of the city. Fleischmann included in his request to “include some African themes”.

Walton composed the overture between February and the end of May 1956, and revised it before publication in 1958 and revised it again after that. For inspiration he requested recordings of African music from the African Music Society. The effect of these recordings can be heard with three percussionists performing on eleven instruments. The composer also incorporated the main theme from Jean Bosco Mwenda’s "Masanga" (which had been released on record in 1954).

Walton described the piece to his publisher as “a non-stop gallop...slightly crazy, hilarious and vulgar”.

Instrumentation and duration

Three flutes (third doubling piccolo), two oboes, cor anglais, three clarinets in A, three bassoons (third doubling contrabassoon) – four horns in F, three trumpets in B-flat, three trombones, tuba – timpani, three or four percussion (side drum, cymbals, suspended cymbal, bass drum, xylophone, tambourine, triangle, tenor drum, maracas, rumba sticks, castanets, glockenspiel) – harp – strings.

The piece takes about seven minutes to perform.

Score

Oxford University Press published an 84 page study score in 1958. The score, edited by David Lloyd-Jones, is included in the William Walton Edition, in volume 14, “Overtures”.

Vilém Tauský arranged a reduced orchestra version in 1957.

First performance

Malcolm Sargent conducted the South African Broadcasting Corporation Symphony Orchestra on September 25, 1956 in a broadcast from City Hall in Johannesburg.

Efrem Kurtz introduced the work to Britain in a Liverpool Philharmonic concert on 13 November 1956.

First recording

The composer recorded the work with the Philharmonia Orchestra on 26 March 1957.

André Kostelanetz recorded the work with the New York Philharmonic in the Columbia 30th Street Studios on 2 December 1959.

References

Kennedy, Michael. Portrait of Walton. Oxford University Press, 1990, pp. 195–196.
Lloyd, Stephen. William Walton: Muse of Fire. The Boydell Press, 2001. pp. 229, 244, 257, 307.
North, James H. New York Philharmonic: The Authorized Recordings, 1917–2005. The Scarecrow Press, 2006, pp. 120 & 341.
Tierney, Neil. William Walton: His Life and Time. Robert Hale, 1984, p. 202.

Compositions by William Walton
Concert overtures
1956 compositions
Johannesburg